Eupithecia dolia is a moth in the family Geometridae. It is found on the Philippines.

References

Moths described in 1929
dolia
Moths of Asia